The 1932 Twickenham by-election was a parliamentary by-election held on 16 September 1932 for the British House of Commons constituency of Twickenham in Middlesex.

The seat had become vacant when the constituency's Conservative Member of Parliament (MP), Sir John Ferguson, died on 17 July 1932, aged 62.  He had held the seat since a by-election in 1929.

The result was a victory for the 29-year-old Conservative candidate Hylton Murray-Philipson, who died in office two years later, which caused another by-election.

Votes

See also
 Twickenham constituency
 Twickenham
 1929 Twickenham by-election
 1934 Twickenham by-election
 1955 Twickenham by-election
 List of United Kingdom by-elections

References
 
 

Elections in the London Borough of Richmond upon Thames
By-elections to the Parliament of the United Kingdom in London constituencies
Twickenham
1932 elections in the United Kingdom
1932 in England
20th century in Middlesex